Engl or Engl. may refer to:

England, a country that is part of the United Kingdom
English
Engl (surname), a German surname
Engl., taxonomic abbreviation for botanist Adolf Engler